Dania Nour (born 2 November 2003 in Bethlehem) is a Palestinian swimmer.

Career
She represented Palestine at the 2018 Asian Games held in Jakarta, Indonesia. She competed in the women's 50 metre freestyle, women's 100 metre freestyle and women's 50 metre butterfly events and in each event she did not advance to compete in the final.

In 2019, she represented Palestine at the World Aquatics Championships held in Gwangju, South Korea. She competed in the women's 50 metre freestyle and women's 50 metre butterfly events. In both events she did not advance to compete in the semi-finals.

She qualified to represent Palestine at the 2020 Summer Olympics in Tokyo, Japan.

References 

Living people
2003 births
Palestinian female butterfly swimmers
Palestinian female freestyle swimmers
Swimmers at the 2018 Asian Games
Asian Games competitors for Palestine
People from Bethlehem
Swimmers at the 2020 Summer Olympics